Adam Ostrowski (born 10 July 1945 in Brzeźce – 29 November 2022) was a Polish wrestler who competed in the 1968 Summer Olympics, in the 1972 Summer Olympics, and in the 1976 Summer Olympics.

A 1968 champion of Poland in welterweight, he also won a bronze medal at the 1975 World Wrestling Championships and a silver medal at the 1970 European Wrestling Championships, both in middleweight.

He died on 29 November 2022, at the age of 77.

References

External links 
 
 
 

1945 births
2022 deaths
Olympic wrestlers of Poland
Wrestlers at the 1968 Summer Olympics
Wrestlers at the 1972 Summer Olympics
Wrestlers at the 1976 Summer Olympics
Polish male sport wrestlers
People from Kędzierzyn-Koźle County
Sportspeople from Opole Voivodeship
20th-century Polish people
21st-century Polish people